The 2018 3. divisjon (referred to as Norsk Tipping-ligaen for sponsorship reasons) was a fourth-tier Norwegian football league season. The league consisted of 84 teams divided into 6 groups of  teams and began on 13 April 2018.

The league was played as a double round-robin tournament, where all teams played 26 matches.

League tables

Group 1

Group 2

Group 3

Group 4

Group 5

Group 6

Top scorers

References 

Norwegian Third Division seasons
3
Norway
Norway